Paul O'Grady Live is a British comedy chat show hosted by Paul O'Grady, that began airing on 10 September 2010 on ITV. The show is a Friday night chat show that features a mixture of celebrity guests, airing at 21:00. The show culminates with different Vegas-style acts or music artist performing live on the show. The show has averaged 3.74 million viewers. Series one of the programme finished on 12 November 2010, although a Christmas special aired on 24 December 2010. The show's second series began on 15 April 2011 and ended on 8 July 2011, the show has not been on air since.

History
O'Grady previously presented The Paul O'Grady Show, which was a huge success due to its variety of speciality acts and high-profile celebrity guests. The show featured comic stunts, musical performances, and occasionally viewer competitions. It ran for eight series on Channel 4 and three on ITV. Paul O'Grady Live is similar in format, but more adult-themed.

Episodes

Series 1

Series 2

Ratings
Most episodes throughout the show's first series averaged over 3 million viewers. Series one averaged 3.87 million viewers.  Series two averaged 3.37 million viewers.

References

External links

2010s British television talk shows
2010 British television series debuts
2011 British television series endings
British television talk shows
English-language television shows
ITV (TV network) original programming
Paul O'Grady